Roman Anthony (born May 13, 2004) is an American baseball outfielder in the Boston Red Sox organization.

Amateur career
Anthony lives in North Palm Beach, Florida, and attended Marjory Stoneman Douglas High School. He committed to play college baseball at Ole Miss after his sophomore year. He was named the Broward County 7-A Player of the Year by the Sun Sentinel after hitting for a .363 average with five home runs, six doubles, and 22 RBIs with 26 stolen bases and 32 runs scored. As a senior, Anthony batted .520 with 52 hits, 14 doubles, 10 home runs, 40 RBIs, and 36 runs scored and repeated as the Broward 7-A Player of the Year. He was also named the Gatorade Florida Player of the Year and Florida Mr. Baseball. Earlier in the season, Anthony had seven hits in 15 at bats with four stolen bases in the National High School Invitational as the Eagles won the tournament.

Professional career
Anthony was considered a top prospect for the 2022 Major League Baseball draft. The Boston Red Sox selected Anthony 79th overall in the 2022 MLB draft. He signed with the team and received an over-slot signing bonus of $2.5 million. After signing, Anthony was assigned to the Rookie-level Florida Complex League Red Sox to begin his professional career.

References

External links

2004 births
Living people
Baseball outfielders
Baseball players from Florida
People from North Palm Beach, Florida
Sportspeople from Palm Beach, Florida
Florida Complex League Red Sox players
Salem Red Sox players